Invisible Agent is a long-standing Irish record label, founded in Dublin in 2000.

Founded by Warren Daly and Donard McCabe the label has released music from such notable artists as Decal, Chymera, Eomac, Ryan Van Winkle, Corrugated Tunnel, and Ikeaboy. Remix artists include renowned Electro producer Sir Real, Techno legend David Tarrida, Ambient artists Porya Hatami and Cousin Silas

Artists past and present 
 Audio Mainline
 Arche
 Chymera
 Corrugated Tunnel
 Danseizure
 Decal
 David Tarrida
 Def Disko
 Ebauche
 Edwin James
 Eomac
 Ikeaboy
 John Dalton
 Ketsa
 LMD64
 Love Rhino
 Ryan Van Winkle
 Swarm Intelligence a.k.a. Simon Hayes
 The Northern Hemisphere
 Toaster
 vTek
 Warren Daly
 Undermine
 2BiT

External links 
 Invisible Agent – Official site
 Invisible Agent at Discogs.com
 Invisible Agent at Ello.co
 Invisible Agent at Last.fm



Electronic music record labels
Irish independent record labels
Record labels established in 2000